M. fascicularis  may refer to:
 Macaca fascicularis, the crab-eating macaque, a monkey species
 Microtropis fascicularis, a plant species endemic to Malaysia